Brian Ross Hardie (born 14 January 1950) is a professional cricket player who played for Essex County Cricket Club and Scotland between 1970 and 1990.

Born in Stenhousemuir, Falkirk, Scotland, to Fettes-educated banker Col. James Millar Hardie, he played at Stenhousemuir during the 1960s and 1970s, scoring 7065 runs before being signed for Essex where he opened the batting for many years alongside Graham Gooch. Overall he passed 1000 runs eleven times, helping the county to victory in four County Championships in eight seasons and three one-day titles from seven final appearances. In the 1985 NatWest Trophy final he made 110 and won the Man-of-the-Match award in Essex's one-run victory at Lord's.

He is the brother of Scottish international cricketer Keith Hardie.

References

External links
 
 
 Stenhousemuir Cricket Club

1950 births
Living people
Scottish cricketers
Essex cricketers
People from Stenhousemuir
Sportspeople from Falkirk (council area)
Cambridgeshire cricketers
People educated at Larbert High School
People from Larbert